O'Hea may refer to:

 Charles O'Hea (1814-1903), Irish Catholic priest active in Australia
 John Fergus O'Hea (c. 1838–1922), Irish cartoonist
 Matt O'Hea, Australian basketball player
 Patrick O'Hea (1848-?), Irish politician
 Timothy O'Hea (1843-1874), Irish soldier and explorer

In Munster in Ireland the O'Heas of that province, where they had their own lands in Carbery known as Pobble O'Hea, and their own castle, are earliest mentioned a sept of the O'Donovan family, and genetic evidence fully supports the claim as they also belong to Y-DNA clade R-A2220. The O'Heas of Munster have since frequently anglicized their name to Hayes.

See also
 Dál gCais
 Corcu Loígde
 Hayes (surname)

Septs of the Dál gCais
Surnames
Irish families
Surnames of Irish origin